Jurgensen or Jürgensen is a surname of Danish origin. The name refers to:
 Dennis Jürgensen (b. 1961), Danish author of children’s stories
 Eric Jurgensen (contemporary), general manager and programming director of America Television in Peru
 Jacob Dahl Jurgensen (b. 1975), Danish artist and sculptor living in London, England
 Nicola Jürgensen (b. 1975), German clarinetist and academic teacher
 Shane Jurgensen (b. 1978), Australian professional cricket player
 Sonny Jurgensen (b. 1934), American professional football player

Danish-language surnames
Patronymic surnames
Surnames from given names